Selishchi is a rural locality (a village) in Novlyanskoye Rural Settlement, Selivanovsky District, Vladimir Oblast, Russia. The population was 32 as of 2010.

Geography 
Selishchi is located 13 km south of Krasnaya Gorbatka (the district's administrative centre) by road. Shulgino is the nearest rural locality.

References 

Rural localities in Selivanovsky District